Paddock Bulevard - is a skyscraper in Sabadell (suburb of Barcelona), Spain. Completed in 1998, has 20 floors and rises 82 metres. Lies near other two skyscrapers: Torre Millenium and Les Orenetes de l'Eix.

See also 

 List of tallest buildings and structures in Barcelona

References 

Skyscraper office buildings in Barcelona
Office buildings completed in 1998